The 1964 United States presidential election in the District of Columbia took place on November 3, 1964, as part of the 1964 United States presidential election. District of Columbia voters chose three representatives, or electors, to the Electoral College, who voted for president and vice president.

President Lyndon B. Johnson won Washington, D.C. by an overwhelming margin, receiving over 85% of the vote. This was the first presidential election in which the District of Columbia had the right to vote. The District of Columbia has voted Democratic by large margins every time since this election.

This was one of only two elections where Washington, D.C. wasn't the largest margin for either candidate along with 1972, this time being second to a 74.28% margin for Goldwater in Mississippi.

Results

See also
 United States presidential elections in the District of Columbia

References

District of Columbia
1964
United States pres